The Worcester City Art Gallery & Museum is an art gallery and local museum in Worcester, the county town of Worcestershire, England.

History

The museum was founded in 1833 by members of the Worcestershire Natural History Society. It is located in a Victorian building in central Worcester, which opened in 1896. The Worcestershire Regiment Museum collection moved from Norton Barracks to the Worcester City Art Gallery & Museum in 1970.

In 2021 the Art Gallery & Museum received a donation of £300,000 from an unnamed donor.

Collections
The gallery has a programme of contemporary art and craft exhibitions. Displays include the industrial history of Worcester, local geology, natural history, together with 19th- and 20th-century paintings, prints, and photographs. The Worcester Soldier galleries display the collections of the Worcestershire Regiment and the Queen's Own Worcestershire Hussars.

See also 
 List of museums in Worcestershire

References

External links 
Worcester City Art Gallery & Museum website

Museums established in 1833
Library buildings completed in 1896
City Art Gallery and Museum
Art museums and galleries in Worcestershire
Local museums in Worcestershire
History of Worcester, England
Regimental museums in England
1833 establishments in England